The Jackson All-Americans were an American minor pro ice hockey team in Jackson, Michigan. They played in the All-American Hockey League from 1986-1989. The club never finished higher than fourth place in their three seasons.

Season-by-season record

External links

 The Internet Hockey Database
Ice hockey teams in Michigan
Jackson, Michigan
Ice hockey clubs established in 1986
Sports clubs disestablished in 1989
All-American Hockey League teams
1986 establishments in Michigan
1989 disestablishments in Michigan